In relativity, proper time (from Latin, meaning own time) along a timelike world line is defined as the time as measured by a clock following that line. It is thus independent of coordinates, and is a Lorentz scalar. The proper time interval between two events on a world line is the change in proper time. This interval is the quantity of interest, since proper time itself is fixed only up to an arbitrary additive constant, namely the setting of the clock at some event along the world line.

The proper time interval between two events depends not only on the events, but also the world line connecting them, and hence on the motion of the clock between the events. It is expressed as an integral over the world line (analogous to arc length in Euclidean space). An accelerated clock will measure a smaller elapsed time between two events than that measured by a non-accelerated (inertial) clock between the same two events. The twin paradox is an example of this effect.

By convention, proper time is usually represented by the Greek letter τ (tau) to distinguish it from coordinate time represented by t. Coordinate time is the time between two events as measured by an observer using that observer's own method of assigning a time to an event. In the special case of an inertial observer in special relativity, the time is measured using the observer's clock and the observer's definition of simultaneity.

The concept of proper time was introduced by Hermann Minkowski in 1908, and is an important feature of Minkowski diagrams.

Mathematical formalism 

The formal definition of proper time involves describing the path through spacetime that represents a clock, observer, or test particle, and the metric structure of that spacetime. Proper time is the pseudo-Riemannian arc length of world lines in four-dimensional spacetime. From the mathematical point of view, coordinate time is assumed to be predefined and an expression for proper time as a function of coordinate time is required. On the other hand, proper time is measured experimentally and coordinate time is calculated from the proper time of inertial clocks.

Proper time can only be defined for timelike paths through spacetime which allow for the construction of an accompanying set of physical rulers and clocks. The same formalism for spacelike paths leads to a measurement of proper distance rather than proper time. For lightlike paths, there exists no concept of proper time and it is undefined as the spacetime interval is zero. Instead, an arbitrary and physically irrelevant affine parameter unrelated to time must be introduced.

In special relativity
With the timelike convention for the metric signature, the Minkowski metric is defined by

and the coordinates by

for arbitrary Lorentz frames.

In any such frame an infinitesimal interval, here assumed timelike, between two events is expressed as

and separates points on a trajectory of a particle (think clock). The same interval can be expressed in coordinates such that at each moment, the particle is at rest. Such a frame is called an instantaneous rest frame, denoted here by the coordinates  for each instant. Due to the invariance of the interval (instantaneous rest frames taken at different times are related by Lorentz transformations) one may write

since in the instantaneous rest frame, the particle or the frame itself is at rest, i.e., . Since the interval is assumed timelike (ie. ), taking the square root of the above yields

or

Here  is the worldline from some initial event to some final event with the ordering of the events fixed by the requirement that the final event occurs later according to the clock than the initial event.

Using  and again the invariance of the interval, one may write

The first expression is manifestly Lorentz invariant. They are all Lorentz invariant, since proper time and proper time intervals are coordinate-independent by definition.

If , are parameterised by a parameter , this can be written as

If the motion of the particle is constant, the expression simplifies to

where Δ means the change in coordinates between the initial and final events. The definition in special relativity generalizes straightforwardly to general relativity as follows below.

In general relativity

Proper time is defined in general relativity as follows: Given a pseudo-Riemannian manifold with a local coordinates  and equipped with a metric tensor , the proper time interval  between two events along a timelike path  is given by the line integral

This expression is, as it should be, invariant under coordinate changes. It reduces (in appropriate coordinates) to the expression of special relativity in flat spacetime.

In the same way that coordinates can be chosen such that  in special relativity, this can be done in general relativity too. Then, in these coordinates,

This expression generalizes definition  and can be taken as the definition.

Examples in special relativity

Example 1: The twin "paradox" 

For a twin paradox scenario, let there be an observer A who moves between the A-coordinates (0,0,0,0) and (10 years, 0, 0, 0) inertially. The proper time interval for A between the two events is then

So being "at rest" in a special relativity coordinate system means that proper time and coordinate time are the same.

Let there now be another observer B who travels in the x direction from (0,0,0,0) for 5 years of A-coordinate time at 0.866c to (5 years, 4.33 light-years, 0, 0). Once there, B accelerates, and travels in the other spatial direction for another 5 years of A-coordinate time to (10 years, 0, 0, 0). For each leg of the trip, the proper time interval can be calculated using A-coordinates, and is given by

So the total proper time for observer B to go from (0,0,0,0) to (5 years, 4.33 light-years, 0, 0) and then to (10 years, 0, 0, 0) is

Thus it is shown that the proper time equation incorporates the time dilation effect. In fact, for an object in a SR (special relativity) spacetime traveling with velocity  for a time , the proper time interval experienced is

which is the SR time dilation formula.

Example 2: The rotating disk 

An observer rotating around another inertial observer is in an accelerated frame of reference. For such an observer, the incremental form of the proper time equation is needed, along with a parameterized description of the path being taken, as shown below.

The incremental proper time formula then becomes

This result is the same as for the linear motion example, and shows the general application of the integral form of the proper time formula.

Examples in general relativity 

The difference between SR and general relativity (GR) is that in GR one can use any metric which is a solution of the Einstein field equations, not just the Minkowski metric. Because inertial motion in curved spacetimes lacks the simple expression it has in SR, the line integral form of the proper time equation must always be used.

Example 3: The rotating disk (again) 

An appropriate coordinate conversion done against the Minkowski metric creates coordinates where an object on a rotating disk stays in the same spatial coordinate position. The new coordinates are

and

The t and z coordinates remain unchanged. In this new coordinate system, the incremental proper time equation is

With r, θ, and z being constant over time, this simplifies to

which is the same as in Example 2.

Now let there be an object off of the rotating disk and at inertial rest with respect to the center of the disk and at a distance of R from it. Now the proper time equation becomes

So for the inertial at-rest observer, coordinate time and proper time are once again found to pass at the same rate, as expected and required for the internal self-consistency of relativity theory.

Example 4: The Schwarzschild solution – time on the Earth 

The Schwarzschild solution has an incremental proper time equation of

where
t is time as calibrated with a clock distant from and at inertial rest with respect to the Earth,
r is a radial coordinate (which is effectively the distance from the Earth's center),
ɸ is a co-latitudinal coordinate, the angular separation from the north pole in radians.
θ is a longitudinal coordinate, analogous to the longitude on the Earth's surface but independent of the Earth's rotation. This is also given in radians.
m is the geometrized mass of the Earth, m = GM/c2,
M is the mass of the Earth,
G is the gravitational constant.

To demonstrate the use of the proper time relationship, several sub-examples involving the Earth will be used here.

For the Earth, meaning that . When standing on the north pole, we can assume  (meaning that we are neither moving up or down or along the surface of the Earth). In this case, the Schwarzschild solution proper time equation becomes . Then using the polar radius of the Earth as the radial coordinate (or ), we find that

In addition, the rotation of the Earth needs to be taken into account. So . The proper time equation then produces

From a non-relativistic point of view this should have been the same as the previous result. This example demonstrates how the proper time equation is used, even though the Earth rotates and hence is not spherically symmetric as assumed by the Schwarzschild solution. To describe the effects of rotation more accurately the Kerr metric may be used.

See also
 Lorentz transformation
 Minkowski space
 Proper length
 Proper acceleration
 Proper mass
 Proper velocity
 Clock hypothesis
 Peres metric

Footnotes

References

Minkowski spacetime
Theory of relativity
Timekeeping
Time in physics

de:Zeitdilatation#Eigenzeit